The Faux d'Enson is a mountain of the Jura, located south of Roche-d'Or in the canton of Jura. At an elevation of  it is one of the highest summits in the region of Ajoie. An observation tower is located on the top.

References

External links
Faux d'Enson on Hikr

Mountains of the Jura
Mountains of the canton of Jura
Mountains of Switzerland
Mountains of Switzerland under 1000 metres